Kyrill may refer to:

Kyrill (Dmitrieff) (born 1954), ruling bishop of the Western American Diocese of the Russian Orthodox Church Outside Russia
Kyrill (Yonchev) (1945–2007), archbishop of the Orthodox Church in America
Kyrill (storm), a European windstorm in January 2007

See also
Kyril
Kirill (disambiguation) 
Kiril